Achangi  is a village in the southern state of Karnataka, India. It is located in the Sakleshpur taluk of Hassan district in Karnataka.

See also
 Districts of Karnataka
One of the village in sakleshpur, Achangi have one govtprimary school.

References

External links
 nadakacheri.nic.in/

Villages in Hassan district